Lormi is a city and a nagar panchayat and a Tehsil in Mungeli district in the Indian state of Chhattisgarh.

Geography
It has an average elevation of 315 metres (1033 feet).

Demographics
 India census, Lormi had a population of 12,158. Males constitute 52% of the population and females 48%. Lormi has an average literacy rate of 63%, higher than the national average of 59.5%: male literacy is 73%, and female literacy is 52%. In Lormi, 15% of the population is under 6 years of age.

References

Cities and towns in Mungeli district